George Middleton may refer to:

 George Middleton (activist) (1735–1815), African-American Revolutionary War veteran, activist, and Freemason
 George Middleton (American politician) (1800–1888), New Jersey congressman
 George H. Middleton (died 1892), Scottish engineer
 George "Bay" Middleton (1846–1892), British equestrian
 Sir George Middleton (British politician) (1876–1938), Labour Member of Parliament for Carlisle 1922–1924, 1929–1931
 George Middleton (playwright) (1880–1967), American playwright, director, and producer
 George Middleton (trade unionist) (1898–1971), General Secretary of the Scottish Trades Union Congress
 Sir George Middleton (diplomat) (1910–1998), British diplomat